Joseph George Connolly [Coaster Joe] (June 27, 1894 – March 30, 1960) was a backup outfielder in Major League Baseball who played for three clubs from 1921 through 1924. He was born in San Francisco, California.

Connolly reached the majors in 1921 with the New York Giants, spending part of the year with them before moving to the Cleveland Indians in 1921. Before the 1924 season, he was sent by Cleveland along with Dan Boone, Steve O'Neill, and Bill Wambsganss to the Boston Red Sox in the same transaction that brought George Burns, Roxy Walters, and Chick Fewster to the Indians. His most productive season came in 1923 with Cleveland, when he hit .303 with three home runs and 25 RBI in 52 games, all career-highs.

In a four-season career, Connolly was a .268 hitter (45-for-168) with three home runs and 32 RBI in 80 games, including 32 runs, 12 doubles, two triples, two stolen bases, and a .349 on-base percentage.

Connolly died in his homeland of San Francisco, California at the age of 65.

Sources 
 Baseball Reference
 Retrosheet

Boston Red Sox players
Cleveland Indians players
New York Giants (NL) players
Major League Baseball outfielders
Baseball players from California
1894 births
1960 deaths